Einfeldia is a genus of European non-biting midges in the subfamily Chironominae of the bloodworm family Chironomidae.

Species
E. austini Beck & Beck, 1970
E. brunneipennis Johannsen, 1905
E. chelonia (Townes, 1945)
E. dissidens (Walker, 1856)
E. natchitocheae (Sublette, 1964)
E. pagana (Meigen, 1838)
E. natchitocheae (Sublette, 1964)
E. pagana (Meigen, 1838)
E. palaearctica Ashe, 1990
E. pectoralis Kieffer, 1924
E. pritiensis Singh and Rawal, 2016

References

Chironomidae
Nematocera genera